Valdecaballeros is a municipality located in the province of Badajoz, Extremadura, Spain. According to the 2006 census (INE), the municipality has a population of 1264 inhabitants.

The Guadalupe River has its mouth in the Guadiana at the Garcia de Sola Dam, barely 1.5 km east of Valdecaballeros. The uncompleted Valdecaballeros Nuclear Power Plant is close to the town.

References

Municipalities in the Province of Badajoz